Yantang Station is a metro station on Line 3 and Line 6 of the Guangzhou Metro. The underground station is located on the Guangshan Highway (Yantang Section) in the Tianhe District of Guangzhou. It started operation on 30October 2010 and on 28December 2013, became an interchange station between Line 3 and Line 6 of the Guangzhou Metro.

Station layout

Exits

References 

Railway stations in China opened in 2010
Guangzhou Metro stations in Tianhe District